Bela Vista (meaning Beautiful View in English) is a neighborhood of the city of Porto Alegre, the state capital of Rio Grande do Sul in Brazil. It was created by Law 2022 of December 7, 1959. Bela Vista is characterized by its apartment buildings, some of which are very sophisticated, embracing people from the upper middle class to the upper class.

See also
 List of neighborhoods of Porto Alegre

External links

Porto Alegre Homepage

Neighbourhoods in Porto Alegre
Populated places established in 1959